Roman Walter Bentz (September 1, 1919 – June 24, 1996) was an American football offensive lineman in the All-America Football Conference for the New York Yankees and San Francisco 49ers. He played college football at Tulane University and was drafted in the 25th round of the 1943 NFL Draft by the Washington Redskins.

References

1919 births
1996 deaths
American football offensive linemen
New York Yankees (AAFC) players
People from Iron Ridge, Wisconsin
People from Tomahawk, Wisconsin
Players of American football from Wisconsin
San Francisco 49ers (AAFC) players
Tulane Green Wave football players
San Francisco 49ers players